Micragrella is a genus of moths in the subfamily Arctiinae. The genus was erected by Watson in 1980.

Species
 Micragrella aetolia H. Druce, 1900
 Micragrella ochrea Hampson, 1901
 Micragrella sanguiceps Hampson, 1898

References

External links

Arctiinae